Ganesh Chandra Jena (born 5 May 1972) is a mountaineer from Odisha, India. He reached the peak of Mount Everest on 18 May 2011 as the first male from the eastern state of Orissa. Two other Indians in his team were Amit Kumar from Haryana and Jackie Jack from Rajasthan. The team was headed by Anshu Jamsenpa, 32.
After Kalpana Dash, Ganesh Jena achieved this feat as the second Oriya and the first male person from Odisha
"Willpower, patience and determination hold the key to success. My target is to scale the Everest twice in one season," he said to media persons after his successful Everest mission.

Personal life
He was born to Late Kantaru Jena in Sitapur, Paralakhemundi of Gajapati district in Odisha. Currently he resides in Bhubaneshwar and serves for Bhubaneswar Development Authority.

He was always inclined towards adventure sports since his youth and moved towards his goal despite of poor financial conditions. He has participated in many more adventure sports.

His mountaineering achievements are:
 1996 - Mt. Bandarpunch Peak (21673 ft.)
 1998 & 2005 - Mt. Stok Kangri Peak (two occasions)
 1998 - Mt. Ladakhi Peak (5662 m)
 1998 - Mt. Shetidhar Peak (5293 m)
 1999 - Mt. Mamostong Kangri (24,400 ft.) Peak
 1999 - Mt. Stok Kangri Peak
 2000 - Mt. Golep Kangri Peak
 2007 - Mt. Friendship Peak (5340 m)
 2002 - Mt. Saser Kangri Peak (7672 m) organised by Y.A.M.A, Chandigarh.
 18 May 2011 - Mount Everest (8848 m)
 1 August 2015 - Mount Elbrus, Russia (5642 m) 

Other adventure expeditions to his credit are:
 2005 - Motor Cycle Expedition (Chandigarh to Khardungla - World's highest Motorable Pass via Kargil, Srinagar and back)
 1999 – 7 km. Adventure Canal Swimming Competition.
 1999 – 500 km Adventure Cycle Expedition from Bhubaneswar to Chandigarh and back.
 1995 & 1996 – 160 km adventure coastal trek from Konark to Gopalpur in Odisha organised by the Department of Sports & Youth Services.
 29 May 2013 - participated in Everest Marathon as a single participant from India.

He participates in National Adventure Festival at Chandigarh since 1995. He was Guest Instructor for National Adventure Festival from 2002 to 2009.
Ganesh was honoured with ‘Adamaya Sahas Puruskar’ by Haryana government in 2013.
He was to begin his Mount Kanchenjunga Mission from 1 April 2014 which was expected to end on 31 May. He was denied leave by his employer and he had to abort the mission.

On 26 July 2015, Ganesh Jena started climbing the 5642 meter high Mount Elbrus in Moscow, Russia. A six-member team from India headed by Ganesh unfurled tiranga (the national flag) at 8:45 PM on 1 August 2015. Earlier in a grand ceremony former Sports and Youth Services director Dr Bimalendu Mohanty and former assistant director Ashok Mohanty flagged off Jena. He is the first Indian climber who did a traverse climbing (to climb a mountain by one route and come down by another) of the Elbrus from South side and returned to North side.

See also
Indian summiters of Mount Everest - Year wise
List of Mount Everest summiters by number of times to the summit
List of Mount Everest records of India
List of Mount Everest records

References

1972 births
Living people
People from Odisha
Indian summiters of Mount Everest
Indian mountain climbers